Stathmopoda pedella is a species of moth of the family Stathmopodidae. It is found in Europe.

The wingspan is 10–14 mm. The moth flies in July depending on the location.

The larvae feed on the seeds of ripening fruits of the alder.

References

Stathmopodidae
Moths described in 1761
Moths of Europe
Moths of Japan
Taxa named by Carl Linnaeus